Lankhorst may refer to:

People 
 Marc Lankhorst (b. 1968), Dutch computer scientist
 Peter Lankhorst (b. 1947), Dutch politician

Places 
 Lankhorst - a hamlet near the city of Meppel

Dutch-language surnames